Gamal Al Din Muhammad Hosni El Sayed Mubarak (born 27 December 1963) is the younger of the two sons of former Egyptian President Hosni Mubarak and former First Lady Suzanne Mubarak. In contrast to his older brother Alaa, Gamal had pursued an active public profile and was starting to wield some influence on political life in the country before the revolution of early 2011.

Prior to the revolution, Gamal was deputy secretary-general of the then-ruling and now-dissolved National Democratic Party, and head of its influential policies committee.

In 2014 and 2015, he was convicted of political corruption for diverting nearly $20 million in state funds to private use, along with his father and brother, and sentenced to four years in prison.

Within the family, under his half-Welsh mother, his name is "Jimmy", while his brother Alaa is "Alan".

Early life and career
Mubarak's given name, Gamal, comes from Egypt's second president, Gamal Abdel Nasser. For his early education, he attended St. George's College, Cairo before entering the American University in Cairo. He graduated with a business administration degree and he also earned an MBA from the university. He began his professional career working for Bank of America. 
Mubarak left Bank of America to set up London-based Medinvest Associates Ltd, which manages a private equity fund, and to do some corporate finance consultancy work.

Inheritance of power 
The grooming of Gamal Mubarak to be his father's successor as the next president of Egypt became increasingly evident at around 2000. With no vice-president, and with no heir-apparent in sight, Gamal started enjoying considerable attention in Egyptian state-run media. On 3 February 2000, Hosni Mubarak appointed him to the General Secretariat of the ruling National Democratic Party. Bashar al-Assad's rise to power in Syria in June 2000 just hours after Hafez al-Assad's death, sparked a heated debate in the Egyptian press regarding the prospects for a similar scenario occurring in Cairo.

Mubarak founded, and became chairman of, the Future Generation Foundation (FGF), an NGO supporting job training but which also served as a vehicle for Mubarak's political career.

Both President Mubarak and his son denied the possibility of any inheritance of power in Egypt. More recently, this claim was made in early 2006, when Gamal Mubarak declared repeatedly that he had no aspiration to succeed his father, but that he would maintain his position in the then-ruling NDP as deputy secretary general, a post he held in addition to heading the party's policy committee, allegedly the most important organ of the NDP.

In September 2004, several political groups (most are unofficial), on both the left and the right, announced their sharp opposition to the inheritance of power. They demanded political change and a fair, multi-candidate election.

On 26 February 2005, Mubarak ordered the constitution changed to allow multi-candidate presidential elections before September 2005 by asking parliament to amend Article 76 of the Egyptian constitution.  This change in the constitution was seen then by some analysts and senior judicial figures as a ploy to seamlessly allow Gamal Mubarak to inherit the top position in Egypt.  According to this view, Gamal Mubarak would be one of the candidates in a presidential elections and would be supported by the ruling party and the government-controlled media. Since remaining serious candidates would be disqualified by the NDP-controlled People's Assembly leaving only the less popular candidates, the inheritance of power would be accomplished through a "democratic" process. However these were all merely assumptions made by political activists, analysts, and opponents.

End of his father's presidency
Some political analysts speculate that the alleged deteriorating state of the Egyptian economy in the last days of Hosni Mubarak's rule was caused by Gamal and his friends taking over as political advisers to Mubarak. On the other hand, a wide range of analysts credit Gamal Mubarak for reviving the Egyptian economy over the previous five years, from a stagnant, mostly state-run economy to a largely free market system that enjoyed five percent GDP growth.

During the first week of the 2011 Egyptian Revolution there were unconfirmed reports and speculation that Gamal might have left Egypt during the protests. However, on 3 February 2011, Gamal was present for an ABC News interview of his father in Cairo.

As the 2011 Egyptian revolution unfolded, newly appointed vice president Omar Suleiman met a major public concern when he announced on 3 February 2011 that Gamal Mubarak would not seek election.

Reuters Africa reported that a fight took place between him and his older brother, Alaa Mubarak. Alaa supposedly accused Gamal of ruining their father's last days in power and humiliating him.

Political corruption convictions
Following the stepping down of Hosni Mubarak, media sources started to point to the 'suspicious' financial dealings of Gamal Mubarak. On 28 February 2011, the Egyptian daily Al-Ahram published a list of bank accounts allegedly belonging to Gamal Mubarak. Al-Ahram reported that the Chief Prosecutor of Egypt received a report that Gamal Mubarak inexplicably amassed significant sums of money that were deposited in these accounts. This allegation came on background of a decision from the Prosecutor General of Egypt to freeze all bank accounts belonging to the Mubarak family, including Gamal Mubarak. The Egyptian Appeals Court ordered that Mubarak's financial status is reviewed by the court on 5 March 2011. It is expected that the court will render a decision in that hearing whether to uphold the decision to freeze Mubarak's assets.

On 13 April 2011, Gamal was imprisoned for 15 days pending investigations for corruption, abuse of power, and for his alleged role in causing the fatalities and casualties of peaceful protesters during the revolution which was sparked on 25 January 2011. An official investigation accused Gamal Mubarak of using his influence in the National Democratic Party and as son of the president to award contracts to foreign companies in which he was a partner. He appeared in court, alongside his father and brother. Gamal and his brother still remained in prison, whereas their father was released from jail but put on house arrest for 15 days.

On 19 December 2013, Gamal was once again freed after he was acquitted of corruption along with his brother and Ahmed Shafik, ex-candidate of 2012 Egyptian presidential election.

They were retried and convicted again in May 2015. In October 2015 he and his brother were released from prison, based on time already served.

In September 2018, Gamal was arrested along with his brother Alaa and accused of stock market manipulation. The same month, Gamal's long sought chance of a political future ended after he became ineligible for any political office following the Egypt Court of Cassation's decision to uphold his corruption conviction. The corruption convictions of his father and his brother were upheld as well. Both Gamal and his brother were acquitted of the 2018 illicit share trading charge in February 2020.

On 12 March 2021, the European Union revoked the sanctions against nine Egyptian individuals including Mubarak family, adopted since 2011.

Personal life
Mubarak is married to Khadiga al-Gammal, with whom he has two children, Farida and Mahmoud.

References

External links 

 Interview with Gamal Mubarak: "We Need Audacious Leaders", Middle East Quarterly, Winter 2009
 Egypt: Time of the Reformers, Interview by Pascal Drouhaud, Politique internationale, n° 120, Paris, 2008
 Daniel Sobelman, "Gamal Mubarak: President of Egypt?", Middle East Quarterly, Spring 2001
 BBC: "Mubarak son raises public profile", 10 September 2004.
 MSNBC: "Stage set for political dynasty in Egypt?", 28 July 2004.
Foreign Policy: 

1963 births
Living people
21st-century criminals
Egyptian Muslims
Egyptian people of Welsh descent
The American University in Cairo alumni
National Democratic Party (Egypt) politicians
People of the Egyptian revolution of 2011
St. George's College, Cairo alumni
Egyptian politicians convicted of corruption
Gamal
Children of presidents of Egypt
Sons of national leaders